Grandmother's Bay 219 is an Indian reserve of the Lac La Ronge Indian Band in Saskatchewan. Located on Otter Lake, part of the Churchill River system, it is 77 kilometers northeast of Lac la Ronge. In the 2016 Canadian Census, it recorded a population of 342 living in 101 of its 115 total private dwellings. In the same year, its Community Well-Being index was calculated at 44 of 100, compared to 58.4 for the average First Nations community and 77.5 for the average non-Indigenous community.

References

Unincorporated communities in Saskatchewan
Indian reserves in Saskatchewan
Division No. 18, Saskatchewan